The Witches' Sabbath (also known as The Sabbath) is a 1988 Italian-French drama film written and directed by Marco Bellocchio. It is a pagan film and shows the rituals of witches.

Cast 
Béatrice Dalle: Maddalena
Daniel Ezralow: Davide
Corinne Touzet: Cristina
 Jacques Weber : Professor Cadò
 Omero Antonutti : Medico condotto
  Paolo De Vita : Monatto

Production
Actress Raffaella Rossellini accused her colleague Daniel Ezralow of using violence, including carnal violence, on the set. The offending scene is the one in which the male protagonist tries to free himself and take possession of the "witch" Rossellini, embracing and slapping her, attracting and repelling her with force, finally dragging her into a pond. But finally Rossellini recanted by filing a simple labor lawsuit.

References

External links

1988 drama films
1988 films
Films directed by Marco Bellocchio
French drama films
Italian drama films
Witch hunting in fiction
1980s French films
1980s Italian films